Pushthrough is a resettled fishing community located on Newfoundland and Labrador's south coast, about 20 km northwest of Hermitage. Permanent settlement at Pushthrough happened in 1814, when George Chambers moved there from Gaultois to establish a fishing room and later a store. The community lost population to Gaultois in the 1950s and to Head of Bay d'Espoir in the 1960s. In 1968, virtually all the families with school aged children moved, effectively leading to the downfall of the community.

See also
List of lighthouses in Canada

References

External links
 Picture of the lighthouse
 Aids to Navigation Canadian Coast Guard

Ghost towns in Newfoundland and Labrador
Lighthouses in Newfoundland and Labrador